Puce is a dark red or purple brown color, a brownish purple or a "dark reddish brown."

Etymology
The colour is said to be the color of bloodstains on linen or bedsheets, even after being laundered, from flea droppings, or after a flea has been crushed.

The Oxford English Dictionary (OED) dates the first English use of "puce" as a color to 1778. The name comes from the French word puce, or flea, which comes from the Latin word for flea, pulex (stem pulic-). According to the Oxford Dictionary of English Etymology, the first French use of puce as a color name, meaning flea-color, dates to the 17th century. A different source dates the first French use of puce as a color name to the 14th century.

History
The color puce became popular in the late 18th century in France. It appeared in clothing at the Court of Louis XVI, and was said to be a favorite color of Marie Antoinette, though there are no portraits of her wearing it.

Puce was also a popular fashion color in 19th-century Paris. In one of his novels, Émile Zola described a woman "dressed in a gown of a dark color...between puce and the color of goose poop (caca d'oie)." Victor Hugo wrote in Les Misérables, "[...] Mademoiselle Baptistine gentle, slender, frail, somewhat taller than her brother, dressed in a gown of puce-colored silk, of the fashion of 1806, which she had purchased at that date in Paris, and which had lasted ever since."

Variations of puce

Puce (ISCC-NBS)

The color to the right is the color called puce in the ISCC-NBS Dictionary of Color Names (1955). Since this color has a hue code of 353, it is a slightly purplish red.

Puce (Maerz and Paul)

The color box to the right shows the color called puce in the 1930 book by Maerz and Paul, A Dictionary of Color; the color puce is displayed on page 37, Plate 7, Color Sample H4.

Puce (Pourpre color list)

At right is the color called puce in the Pourpre.com color list, a color list widely popular in France.
This is the original puce, from which all other tones of puce ultimately derive.

Puce (Pantone)

The color at right is called puce in the Pantone color list.

The source of this color is the "Pantone Textile Paper eXtended (TPX)" color list, color #19-1518 TPX—Puce.

In popular culture
 In the vintage-bottle-collecting hobby, "puce" is amongst the most desirable colors.
 In the King Arthur legends, Sir Gareth fights Sir Perymones, who is called "The Puce Knight". 
 In Santa Claus: The Movie (1985), Jeffrey Kramer's character, Towser, picks the color puce for the color of Patch the Elf's (Dudley Moore) lollipop.  He describes the color as "like fuchsia, but a shade less lavender and a bit more pink." He also mentions to his boss, B.Z. (John Lithgow) that if the lollipop is a success, the company can come out with a "Puce Juice".

See also

List of colors

References 

Shades of pink
Shades of red
Marie Antoinette
History of fashion